The 2016 Men's South American Volleyball Club Championship was the eighth official edition of the men's volleyball tournament, played by eight teams from 17 to 21 February 2016 in Taubate, Brazil. 

Sada Cruzeiro defeated the local team Funvic Taubaté in the final match, and qualified for the 2016 Club World Championship.

Pools composition

Preliminary round
All times are Brasilia Time (UTC−03:00).

Pool A

|}

|}

Poolb

|}

|}

Final standing

Awards

Most Valuable Player
  Yoandry Leal (Sada Cruzeiro)
Best Setter
  William Arjona (Sada Cruzeiro)
Best Outside Spikers
  Ricardo Lucarelli Souza (Funvic Taubaté)
  Nikolay Uchikov (UPCN San Juan)

Best Middle Blockers
  Isac Santos (Sada Cruzeiro)
  Deivid Costa (Funvic Taubaté)
Best Opposite Spiker
  Wallace de Souza (Sada Cruzeiro)
Best Libero
  Felipe Silva (Funvic Taubaté)

Notes

References

External links
CSV

Volleyball
Men's South American Volleyball Club Championship
Volleyball
Men's South American Volleyball Club Championship